= Kondwadi =

Village in Maharashtra

- Village
- Interactive map of Kondwadi
- Country: India
- State: Maharashtra

Kondwadi is a small village in Ratnagiri district, Maharashtra state in Western India. The 2011 Census of India recorded a total of 271 residents in the village. Kondwadi's geographical area is approximately 326 hectares (810 acres).
